People's Convention (United Kingdom), a proposed UK 1940s convention
 People's Convention 2020, a virtual event in the USA in 2020